Hady Sherif Khashaba (born 19 December 1972) is an Egyptian former footballer who played at both professional and international levels as a midfielder.

Career

Club career
Khashaba spent his entire professional career with one club, Al Ahly, from 1991 to 2006.

International career
Khashaba made three appearances at the 1991 FIFA World Youth Championship.

Khashaba earned 84 caps for the Egyptian senior side between 1992 and 2004, scoring twelve goals. Khashaba represented them at the 1992 Summer Olympics in Barcelona., the 1999 FIFA Confederations Cup, and at the Africa Cup of Nations in 1998, 2000 and 2004.

International goals
Scores and results list Egypt's goal tally first.

References

1972 births
Living people
Egyptian footballers
Egypt international footballers
Olympic footballers of Egypt
Footballers at the 1992 Summer Olympics
1999 FIFA Confederations Cup players
1996 African Cup of Nations players
1998 African Cup of Nations players
2000 African Cup of Nations players
2004 African Cup of Nations players
Association football midfielders
People from Asyut Governorate